Bratwursthäusle Nürnberg is the oldest restaurant in Nuremberg, Bavaria state, Germany. It was founded in 1312 and is located in the city historic center.
The restaurant is famous for producing the original Nuremberg Bratwurst (grilled sausages) and the European Union gave the Nuremberg bratwurst the Protected Geographical Indication (PGI) in 2003, as the first sausage in Europe.

See also 
List of oldest companies

References

External links 
Homepage in German
Facebook page

Restaurants in Germany
Companies established in the 14th century
14th-century establishments in the Holy Roman Empire